The Loudest Voice is a 2019 American drama television miniseries depicting Roger Ailes as he creates and guides the rise of Fox News. It is based on the 2014 book The Loudest Voice in the Room, by Gabriel Sherman, and premiered June 30, 2019, on Showtime.

Premise
The Loudest Voice tells the story of Roger Ailes, who turned Fox News into one of the most powerful, influential media networks in history. It depicts Ailes becoming one of the most prominent figures in modern American conservatism, with flashbacks to the 9/11 attacks, the 2008 U.S. presidential election and 2016 U.S. presidential election, as well as the numerous sexual harassment accusations and settlements that ended his career.

Cast and characters

Main
 Russell Crowe as Roger Ailes
 Seth MacFarlane as Brian Lewis
 Sienna Miller as Beth Tilson Ailes
 Simon McBurney as Rupert Murdoch
 Annabelle Wallis as Laurie Luhn
 Aleksa Palladino as Judy Laterza
 Naomi Watts as Gretchen Carlson

Recurring
 Josh Stamberg as Bill Shine
 Mackenzie Astin as John Moody
 Barry Watson as Lachlan Murdoch
 Guy Boyd as Chet Collier
 Josh Charles as Casey Close
 Emory Cohen as Joe Lindsley
 Patch Darragh as Sean Hannity
 Lucy Owen as Suzanne Scott
 David Whalen as Steve Doocy
 Josh McDermitt as Glenn Beck
 Josh Helman as James Murdoch
 Jenna Leigh Green as Irena Briganti

Guest stars
 John Finn as Jack Welch
 Peter Grosz as Alan Colmes
 Fran Kranz as Gabriel Sherman
 Jessica Hecht as Nancy Erika Smith
 Timothy Busfield as Neil Mullin
 David Cromer as David Axelrod
 Julee Cerda as Wendi Deng
 Joseph Cortese as Roger Stone
 John Rue as Dick Cheney
 Eric Michael Gillett as Paul Manafort

Episodes

Production

Development
On October 19, 2016, it was announced that Blumhouse Television was developing a television miniseries adaptation of the book The Loudest Voice in the Room by Gabriel Sherman. Tom McCarthy was expected to oversee the series and serve as an executive producer and Sherman and Jennifer Stahl were set as writers and co-executive producers. On April 4, 2017, it was announced that Showtime had put the series, titled Secure and Hold: The Last Days of Roger Ailes, into development. It was further announced that McCarthy would also serve as writer for the series alongside John Harrington Bland and that Sherman had been upped to an executive producer. On May 18, 2017, following Ailes's death, it was confirmed that the series was still in development.

On June 25, 2018, it was announced that Showtime had given the production, now untitled, a series order consisting of eight episodes. Additionally, it was announced that McCarthy and Sherman had co-written the first episode together and that Jason Blum, Alex Metcalf, Marci Wiseman, and Jeremy Gold would serve as further executive producers. On August 23, 2018, it was announced that Kari Skogland would direct the first two episodes of the series. On October 5, 2018, it was reported that Russell Crowe and Liza Chasin would serve the production as additional executive producers and that 3dot Productions would serve as a further production company for the series. On October 30, 2018, it was announced that the character of Megyn Kelly had been cut out of the series. The role had yet to be cast and reportedly only appeared in a few scenes. Sherman commented on the removal saying, "Megyn Kelly was a peripheral participant in Ailes's downfall. It was Gretchen Carlson and her lawyer Nancy Erika Smith who drove the events that led to Ailes's ouster...By the time [Kelly] spoke to investigators, Ailes's fate had been sealed. Any dramatization that makes her a central character in Ailes's takedown is pure fiction."

On November 20, 2018, it was reported that Larry Klayman, a lawyer representing former Fox News booker Laurie Luhn, had sent an email to several attorneys who represent Showtime and Blumhouse Television in regards to Luhn's concern that she would be portrayed inaccurately in the series. Based on Sherman's original reporting upon which the series is based, Luhn was reportedly under the impression that she would be portrayed as a "pimp" for Ailes who brought women to him for the purpose of having sex. She alleged that she was actually one of Ailes's victims and that she had sexual acts forced upon her by him and that she was rebuffed by several top executives when she leveled complaints against him. The email went on to express Luhn's desire to act in a consultancy role on the series in order to ensure she is portrayed authentically and explains that if Luhn was not satisfied by her portrayal then there was potential for a future defamation lawsuit. On January 8, 2019, Klayman filed an injunction on Luhn's behalf in the Los Angeles County Superior Court against Showtime, Blumhouse Television, and Sherman seeking damages of $750 million. In the jury-seeking complaint, Klayman wrote that the damages were sought to "punish and impress upon defendants the seriousness of their conduct and to deter similar conduct in the future."

On January 31, 2019, it was announced that the series had been titled The Loudest Voice. On April 11, 2019, it was announced that the series would premiere on June 30, 2019.

Casting
Alongside the series order announcement, it was confirmed that Russell Crowe would star in the series as Roger Ailes. In October 2018, it was announced that Naomi Watts, Seth MacFarlane, Sienna Miller, Simon McBurney, Annabelle Wallis, and Aleksa Palladino had been cast in starring roles. On November 3, 2018, it was reported that David Whalen had joined the cast of the series. On February 5, 2019, it was announced that Barry Watson would appear in a recurring capacity. In March, Josh Charles joined in a recurring role.

Filming
Principal photography for the series commenced during the week of November 5, 2018, in New York City, New York.

Reception
The Loudest Voice has been met with mixed reviews from critics, with Crowe's performance being strongly acclaimed. On the review aggregation website Rotten Tomatoes, it holds a 53% approval rating based on 60 reviews. The website's critical consensus reads, "While finely performed and often fascinating, The Loudest Voice's shallow interpretations undermine what could be a powerful indictment of one of media's most infamous figures." Metacritic, which uses a weighted average, assigned the season a score of 61 out of 100 based on 30 reviews, indicating "generally favorable reviews".

Accolades

See also
Bombshell (2019) – A feature film based on the sexual harassment scandal of Roger Ailes

References

External links

2010s American drama television miniseries
2019 American television series debuts
2019 American television series endings
American biographical series
English-language television shows
Showtime (TV network) original programming
Television shows based on books
Television series about journalism
Works about Fox News
Works about sexual harassment